Luna Park  is a 1960 Argentine film. It follows the story of a young boxer whose dream of fighting in Luna Park Stadium is on conflict with the interests of the sport.

Cast
Pepe Armil
Hugo Astar
Alberto Barcel
Pedro Buchardo
Elisa Daniel
Nora Massi
Luis Orbegozo

External links
 

1960 films
1960s Spanish-language films
Argentine black-and-white films
Argentine drama films
Films directed by Rubén W. Cavallotti
1960s Argentine films